Ere is a village of Wallonia and a district of the municipality of Tournai, located in the province of Hainaut, Belgium. 

The French painter Michel Bouillon is believed to have been born here.

Tournai
Former municipalities of Hainaut (province)